The 2019 Charleston Southern Buccaneers football team represented Charleston Southern University as a member of the Big South Conference during the 2019 NCAA Division I FCS football season. Led by first-year head coach Autry Denson, the Buccaneers compiled an overall record of 6–6 with a mark of 4–2 in conference play, placing third in the Big South. Charleston Southern played home games at Buccaneer Field in Charleston, South Carolina.

Previous season

The Buccaneers finished the 2018 season 5–6, 3–2 in Big South play to finish in third place.

Preseason

Big South poll
In the Big South preseason poll released on July 21, 2019, the Buccaneers were predicted to finish in third place.

Preseason All–Big South team
The Buccaneers had three players selected to the preseason all-Big South team.

Offense

Zack Evans – OL

Defense

J.D. Sosebee – LB

Special teams

Ethan Ray – LS

Schedule

Game summaries

at Furman

at South Carolina

North Carolina A&T

at The Citadel

Savannah State

at Kennesaw State

at North Alabama

Monmouth

at Gardner–Webb

Hampton

at Presbyterian

Campbell

References

Charleston Southern
Charleston Southern Buccaneers football seasons
Charleston Southern Buccaneers football